Ten is the ninth studio album by American heavy metal band Y&T, released in 1990 by Geffen Records. It was recorded in 1989 and is the last Y&T album released before the band took an 18 month hiatus in 1991. Joey Alves had left the band in 1989 and was replaced on rhythm guitar by Stef Burns, while Steve Smith recorded the majority of the drum tracks in place of Jimmy DeGrasso.

Track listing

Personnel
 Dave Meniketti - vocals, guitar
 Stef Burns - guitar, vocals
 Phil Kennemore - bass, vocals
 Jimmy DeGrasso - drums on "City", "She's Gone" & "Goin' Off the Deep End"
 Steve Smith - drums on all tracks except "City", "She's Gone" and "Goin' Off the Deep End"

Additional personal
Jeff Paris - Keyboards, vocals

Production
Mixed at Record Plant, Los Angeles
Kav Deluxe - co-producer
Bill Merryfield - co-producer
Dave Donnelly - supervision
John Kalodner - A&R, Direction
Scott Boorey - management
Kurt DeMunbrun - artwork

Charts

References

Y&T albums
Geffen Records albums
1990 albums
Glam metal albums